The Cocke-Martin-Jackson House is a historic mansion in Brandon, Mississippi, United States.

History
The two-story mansion was built from 1840 to 1845 for Thomas Baytop Cocke, a farmer. It was purchased by Charles Lyman Martin in 1891. When their daughter Ella May married Eugene Edgar Jackson in 1894, they purchased more land and turned it into a  plantation. Several decades later, it was inherited by their son, Eugene Anselum Jackson, who restored it in the 1930s.

The property was purchased by Henry Allen in 1942, with only  left. By the late 1990s, it belonged to their son, Albert Allen.

Architectural significance
It has been listed on the National Register of Historic Places since August 1, 1997.

References

Houses on the National Register of Historic Places in Mississippi
Greek Revival houses in Mississippi
Colonial Revival architecture in Mississippi
Houses completed in 1845
Antebellum architecture
National Register of Historic Places in Rankin County, Mississippi
Brandon, Mississippi